New Bandon is the name for a service district and two different rural communities in the Canadian province of New Brunswick:

 New Bandon-Salmon Beach
 New Bandon, Gloucester County, New Brunswick, a rural community
 New Bandon, Northumberland County, New Brunswick